Bravia (stylized as BRAVIA) is a brand of Sony Visual Products Inc., a wholly owned subsidiary of Sony Group Corporation, and used for its television products. Its backronym is "Best Resolution Audio Visual Integrated Architecture". All Sony high-definition flat-panel LCD televisions in North America have carried the logo for BRAVIA since 2005. BRAVIA replaces the "LCD WEGA" which Sony used for their LCD TVs until Summer 2005 (early promotional photos of the first BRAVIA TVs still bearing the WEGA moniker). In 2014, In the part of Sony  President and CEO Kasuo Hirai's plans to turn Sony around, BRAVIA was made into an subsidiary rather than just a brand of products.

BRAVIA televisions and their components are manufactured in Sony's plants in Mexico, Japan, and Slovakia for their respective regions and are also assembled from imported parts in Brazil, Spain, China, Malaysia and Ecuador. Principal design work for BRAVIA products is performed at Sony's research facilities in Japan, at research and development department at the Sony de Mexico facility in Baja California, Mexico, and at the Sony Europe facility in Nitra, Slovakia.

The brand was also used on mobile phones in North American, Japanese and European markets as of 2007.

Product range

TVs
In May 2013 Sony introduced their first 4K BRAVIA TV models smaller than X900 from late 2012. In May 2015, Sony launched their first lineup of Android television Bravia models, which allows users to easily access content from services like YouTube, Netflix and Hulu as well as install apps and games from the Google Play Store. Noteworthy for being the first Android TV available, Sony's Android TVs are now integrated with the Google Assistant for controlling home automation and voice commands.

In September 2016, Sony announced that TVs older than 2012 will lose access to YouTube.

Sony introduced their first 4K Ultra HD OLED Android TV under the BRAVIA brand, named as the A1E in January 2017 with an X1 Extreme processor. The A8F was the next OLED TV introduced by Sony at CES 2018. At IFA 2018, the A9F with an X1 Ultimate processor was unveiled. In 2019, Sony introduced newer version 4K OLED models, A8G and the Master Series A9G, followed by the A8H in 2020. For 2021 Sony offered the world's first cognitive intelligence TVs with its latest XR A.I. Cognitive Processor in the new A80J and Master Series A90J.

Accessories
In April 2007, Sony launched the BRAVIA TDM-IP1, a docking cradle to permit playback of audio and video hosted on an Apple iPod on a BRAVIA model television.

Current accessories available include a Skype camera (CMUBR100) and Wi-Fi adapter (UWABR100).

Sony Bravia Internet TV and Video 
Sony Bravia Internet Video first became available in late 2009 on Internet enabled Bravia TV's, later becoming available on Sony Blu-ray and home theatre systems. The original Bravia Internet Video was built around Sony's XMB interface and had several streaming media partners including: Amazon Video On Demand, YouTube, Yahoo!, Netflix and Sony Video (Qriocity). 2011 saw a revamp of Bravia Internet Video, with a rework of the interface and an added Skype capability.

Sony Bravia Internet TV is the first TV to incorporate Google TV, currently only available in the US. It plans to revolutionize IPTV.

XBR8 is a series of Sony BRAVIA LCD High Definition Televisions. They were released into the US marketplace starting in September 2008.

The 46- and 55-inch models of the XBR8 series features an RGB LED backlight system which Sony calls Triluminos. The new backlight system is claimed to provide a truer and higher color spectrum and allows this series of televisions to rival plasma displays in terms of dark blacks. This model also marked the debut of Sony's new video processor, the BRAVIA Engine 2 Pro. The display panel uses ten-bit processing and offers the 120 Hz MotionFlow technology.

The XBR8 line offers two screen sizes; the 46" (KDL-46XBR8) was released on September 29, 2008.  The second model, the 55" (KDL-55XBR8) became available for order in October 2008.

In the United Kingdom, recent Bravia Televisions also include YouView built in, which gives users access to an interactive EPG in addition to on-demand services from the BBC and ITV incorporated into a single search menu.

Green TV
For sale in Japan on July 30, 2008, Sony's green product, a new flat-panel 32-inch TV for ¥150,000 (US$1,400; €900) BRAVIA KDL-32JE1 offers ecological consumers the advantage of 70% less energy consumption than regular models with same image quality. For consumers who rely on electricity generated from carbon dioxide emitting sources, it reduces carbon dioxide emissions totaling 79 kilograms (174 pounds) a year.

Mobile phones

Sony uses a BRAVIA image processing engine in high-end mobile devices produced by its Sony Mobile Communications, starting with the Xperia arc model in 2011.  Subsequent flagship models of Sony's smartphone range such as the Xperia S, and Xperia Z use enhanced versions of the BRAVIA engine.

In addition, BRAVIA brand phones have been produced by Sony/Sony Ericsson. BRAVIA brand phones are able to watch 1seg terrestrial television.

For NTT DoCoMo

FOMA SO903iTV (Released in June 2007)
FOMA SO906i (Released in June 2008)
FOMA SO-01C (Sony Ericsson Xperia Arc) (Released in March 2011)

For au by KDDI
U1 (Released in December 2009)
S004 (Released in May 2010)
S005 (Released in November 2010, successor of S004)

Internals
The LCD panels within BRAVIA TVs are manufactured by Sony Corporation with a special architecture. Since 2010, the high end Bravia LX, HX and selected NX series use a 10th gen Sony Bravia ASV panel. The 8th gen SPVA panel from Sony LCD continue to serve other midrange and budget Bravia models.

Many Sony televisions with USB connectivity run Linux.

Upgrading and maintenance
The software can be upgraded via a USB type A interface labeled "DMEx / service only" and via the Internet for later models.

2006–2007 models may be updated using a memory stick or USB. Depending upon the country and TV standard the tuner may need a service device to update it.

It appears that units manufactured through November 2005 for sale in Asia and North America contained
a software bug that prevented the device from powering up/down after 1200 hours. A free upgrade is available.

Uses and features
Can be used to watch live TV
Can stream original contents from streaming apps
It is supported by Dolby audio

Region locking 
Sony TVs sold in 2019 and earlier are region locked, which limited apps and media to be playable only in the same region that the TV was purchased from. However, as of 2020, with the release of the H series BRAVIA TVs, this is no longer the case, and any language can now be selected.

Language table 
The two letters after the Sony TV codename in the build number denote the region.

References

Sony products
High-definition television